Bright Mass with Canons is a mass for choir and organ by the American composer Nico Muhly.  It was written for the choir of Saint Thomas Church Fifth Avenue and its then music director and organist John Scott.  The piece was premiered in New York City in February 2005 by the Choir of Men & Boys of Saint Thomas Church.

Composition
Bright Mass with Canons has a duration of roughly 13 minutes and is scored for organ and SSAATTBB chorus.  Muhly described his prolific use of canons—from which the piece is titled—in the score program notes, writing:

Structure
The piece is composed in four movements:
Kyrie
Gloria
Sanctus & Benedictus
Agnus Dei

Chamber Version

American composer Buck McDaniel arranged a chamber version of the work for the Boston University Tanglewood Institute Festival Chorus scored for chorus, two pianos and percussion. This arrangement premiered in 2014 conducted by Ann Jones.

Reception
Since its premiere, Bright Mass with Canons has received modest praise from music critics.  Allan Kozinn of The New York Times opined, "Driven, joyful motifs, couched in a harmonic language that oscillates between light dissonance and a firmly traditional, Renaissance-like openness, propel the Kyrie, parts of the Gloria and the Sanctus. Those same musical moves take a more introspective, purely devotional turn in the Agnus Dei."  Mark Swed of the Los Angeles Times called the piece "interesting" and said it "has the quality of a Steve Reich mix of old English choral music — clever, bright, show-offy."

Ivan Moody of Gramophone was slightly more critical of the piece, writing:

References

Compositions by Nico Muhly
2005 compositions
Masses (music)